Kaisyuan Jhonghua station is a light rail station of the Circular Line of the Kaohsiung rapid transit system. It is located in Cianjhen District, Kaohsiung, Taiwan.

Station overview
The station is a street-level station with two side platforms. It is located at the junction of Jhonghua 5th Road and Kaisyuan 4th Road.

Station layout

Around the station
 Workforce Development Agency(Kaohsiung-Pingtung-Penghu-Taitung Regional Branch)
 Qianzhen Triangle Park

References

2015 establishments in Taiwan
Railway stations opened in 2015
Circular light rail stations